, is a Japanese professional footballer who plays as a midfielder for  club Kashima Antlers.

Career
After four seasons with J2 League club FC Machida Zelvia, in December 2022 it was announced that Sano would be joining J1 League club Kashima Antlers for the 2023 season.

Career statistics

References

External links

2000 births
Living people
Japanese footballers
Association football midfielders
FC Machida Zelvia players
Kashima Antlers players
J1 League players
J2 League players
Association football people from Okayama Prefecture